Shane Gray (born 3 September 1990) is an Australian professional rugby league footballer.

Background
Born in Newcastle, New South Wales, Gray played his junior rugby league for the South Newcastle Lions in the Newcastle Rugby League, before being signed by the Newcastle Knights.

Playing career
In 2008, Gray played for the Newcastle Knights' NYC team.

In 2008, Gray signed a two-year contract with the Manly-Warringah Sea Eagles starting in 2009. He played for Manly's NYC team in 2009.

In June 2009, Gray tested positive to clenbuterol, a banned substance. He argued that the substance was found in an asthma medication he was prescribed but chose not to contest the two-year ban. He returned to Newcastle to play for South Newcastle again before joining the Burleigh Bears in the Queensland Cup.

In 2012, Gray was named in the Philippines national rugby league team squad to take on Thailand but pulled out due to family commitments.

After drawing the attention of Gold Coast Titans coach John Cartwright, Gray signed a one-year contract with the Gold Coast club starting in 2013.

In round 12 of the 2013 NRL season, Gray made his NRL debut for the Gold Coast against the North Queensland Cowboys.

At the end of 2013, Gray was released by the Gold Coast.

References

External links
2013 Gold Coast Titans profile

1990 births
Living people
Australian rugby league players
Australian people of Filipino descent
Burleigh Bears players
Gold Coast Titans players
Philippines national rugby league team players
Rugby league second-rows
Rugby league props
Rugby league centres
Rugby league players from Newcastle, New South Wales
South Newcastle Lions players